Lauderdale is a city in Ramsey County, Minnesota, United States. The population was 2,379 at the 2010 census. Lauderdale is part of the Minneapolis–St. Paul metropolitan area and is surrounded by Minneapolis, St. Paul, Roseville, and Falcon Heights. Along with Roseville, it is one of two cities to touch both Minneapolis and St Paul.

History
Originally named Rose Hill, Lauderdale was part of the larger Rose Township, named after trader Isaac Rose.  Rose Township included parts of what are now Roseville, Falcon Heights, Minneapolis, Saint Paul, Saint Anthony Village and Lauderdale. In 1871, Rose Hill's first school opened when Heman Gibbs of Gibbs Farm Museum fame donated the land for the school.

The Village of Lauderdale was incorporated on January 21, 1949. It was named after William Henry Lauderdale, a prominent Twin Cities businessman who donated land to Rose Hill Township for a school and park.

Education
Lauderdale is served by the Roseville Area School District (ISD 623).
Part of the Luther Seminary campus is within Lauderdale's city limits.

Geography

Minnesota Highway 280 serves as a main route in the community.

Demographics

2020 census

Note: the US Census treats Hispanic/Latino as an ethnic category. This table excludes Latinos from the racial categories and assigns them to a separate category. Hispanics/Latinos can be of any race.

2010 census
As of the census of 2010, there were 2,379 people, 1,130 households, and 530 families residing in the city. The racial makeup of the city was 71.1% White, 5.3% African American, 0.3% Native American, 19.3% Asian, 1.0% from other races, and 2.9% from two or more races. Hispanic or Latino of any race were 3.4% of the population.

There were 1,130 households, of which 21.2% had children under the age of 18 living with them, 37.6% were married couples living together, 6.0% had a female householder with no husband present, 3.3% had a male householder with no wife present, and 53.1% were non-families. 38.7% of all households were made up of individuals, and 7.1% had someone living alone who was 65 years of age or older. The average household size was 2.10 and the average family size was 2.90.

The median age in the city was 31.5 years. 17.7% of residents were under the age of 18; 13.1% were between the ages of 18 and 24; 39% were from 25 to 44; 20% were from 45 to 64; and 10% were 65 years of age or older. The gender makeup of the city was 49.4% male and 50.6% female.

2000 census
As of the census of 2000, there were 2,364 people, 1,150 households, and 550 families residing in the city. The racial makeup of the city was 78.55% White, 4.91% African American, 0.47% Native American, 12.90% Asian, 0.38% from other races, and 2.79% from two or more races. Hispanic or Latino of any race were 2.58% of the population.

There were 1,150 households, out of which 19.4% had children under the age of 18 living with them, 37.2% were married couples living together, 7.7% had a female householder with no husband present, and 52.1% were non-families. 39.6% of all households were made up of individuals, and 4.6% had someone living alone who was 65 years of age or older.  The average household size was 2.06 and the average family size was 2.81.

In the city, the population was spread out, with 16.9% under the age of 18, 16.3% from 18 to 24, 38.7% from 25 to 44, 19.5% from 45 to 64, and 8.7% who were 65 years of age or older.  The median age was 32 years. For every 100 females, there were 93.6 males.  For every 100 females age 18 and over, there were 94.2 males.

The median income for a household in the city was $39,063, and the median income for a family was $52,813. Males had a median income of $33,542 versus $31,059 for females. The per capita income for the city was $23,293.  About 3.4% of families and 9.3% of the population were below the poverty line, including 2.8% of those under age 18 and none of those age 65 or over.

Leadership
The city's current mayor is Mary Gaasch.

References

External links
City of Lauderdale, MN website

Cities in Minnesota
Cities in Ramsey County, Minnesota